Richard Rosling (born 1946) is a British former sports shooter.

Sports shooting career
Rosling represented England and won a silver medal in the fullbore rifle Queens Prize (Open) event, at the 1982 Commonwealth Games in Brisbane, Queensland, Australia.

References

1946 births
Living people
British male sport shooters
Shooters at the 1982 Commonwealth Games
Commonwealth Games medallists in shooting
Commonwealth Games silver medallists for England
20th-century British people
Medallists at the 1982 Commonwealth Games